Leisure Village is an unincorporated community and census-designated place (CDP) located within Lakewood Township, in Ocean County, New Jersey, United States. As of the 2010 United States Census, the CDP's population was 4,400. The sprawling active adult community is also locally known as "Original" Leisure Village because it was the first of three neighboring active adult communities bearing similar names. Leisure Village East, and Leisure Village West are the other two communities nearby. Original Leisure Village (OLV) is also referred to by the moniker "The Village of Seven Lakes."

Geography
According to the United States Census Bureau, the CDP had a total area of 1.394 square miles (3.610 km2), including 1.310 square miles (3.393 km2) of land and 0.084 square miles (0.217 km2) of water (6.00%).

Demographics

Census 2010

Census 2000
As of the 2000 United States Census there were 4,443 people, 2,805 households, and 984 families living in the CDP. The population density was 1,394.7/km2 (3,601.0/mi2). There were 3,122 housing units at an average density of 980.0/km2 (2,530.3/mi2). The racial makeup of the CDP was 93.70% White, 3.26% African American, 0.02% Native American, 0.54% Asian, 0.02% Pacific Islander, 1.22% from other races, and 1.24% from two or more races. Hispanic or Latino of any race were 5.78% of the population.

There were 2,805 households, out of which 4.8% had children under the age of 18 living with them, 28.0% were married couples living together, 5.3% had a female householder with no husband present, and 64.9% were non-families. 62.3% of all households were made up of individuals, and 55.6% had someone living alone who was 65 years of age or older. The average household size was 1.56 and the average family size was 2.45.

In the CDP the population was spread out, with 7.3% under the age of 18, 2.4% from 18 to 24, 9.1% from 25 to 44, 15.5% from 45 to 64, and 65.7% who were 65 years of age or older. The median age was 72 years. For every 100 females, there were 54.6 males. For every 100 females age 18 and over, there were 51.4 males.

The median income for a household in the CDP was $24,496, and the median income for a family was $33,179. Males had a median income of $37,045 versus $24,816 for females. The per capita income for the CDP was $23,246. About 4.0% of families and 6.9% of the population were below the poverty line, including none of those under age 18 and 6.5% of those age 65 or over.

References

External links

 

Census-designated places in Ocean County, New Jersey
Lakewood Township, New Jersey